The Almendares club, also known as the Almendares Alacranes, was one of the oldest and most distinguished baseball teams in the old Cuban League, which existed from 1878 to 1961.  Almendares represented the Almendares District on the outskirts of the old city of Havana—when the league was founded it was still considered a suburban area, but later became a district within the enlarged city.  Almendares was one of the most successful franchises in the Cuban League.  In their early history they were known by their colors as the Blues; later they adopted the name of Alacranes (Spanish: Scorpions).  Throughout their existence they had a famous rivalry with the Habana baseball club.

History
Baseball in Cuba was more than a sport; it became part of Cuba’s national identity.  As baseball grew in the United States, its popularity also grew in Cuba.  Cubans living in the U.S. learned and loved baseball, and realized it would be important for their country to have this sport for national unity.  For Cubans, baseball offered the  possibility of national integration of all Cubans, of all classes, black  and white, young and old, men and women.  Baseball also offered the Cubans something new to do, a new source of membership, an opportunity participate in something that was perceived to be distinctly Cuban.  Cuba had successful baseball teams and players, which tended to unify the country.  The Cuban people took great pride in their success in baseball.

After a period of intramural play, professional teams were established.  The Cuban League was founded in 1878, two years after the birth of the National League in the U.S.  The original three professional clubs were the Habana, Matanzas, and Almendares.  Teams were named for their areas.  

Almendares won its first championship in 1893–94, carried by pitching ace Juan Manuel Pastoriza, the first of many good club pitchers. One thing that made the Almendares Baseball Club so successful is that it built its team around pitching rather than hitting.  Almendares had many successful pitchers, including José Méndez and Adolfo Luque.

Almendares was the first Cuban team to play against a United States team, an 1881 game in Cuba, against the Bitter Hops Baseball Club.  Throughout its existence Almendares had a rivalry with Habana. This rivalry started at the beginning of professional league play and lasted until the end.  The club even had its own newspaper and magazine, called El Almendarista. These publications grew in popularity almost as fast as new teams started. In 1886 baseball in Cuba was drawing record crowds.  A championship game between Habana and Almendares had more than 6,000 fans  attending. 

Baseball was absent in Cuba from 1895 to 1897 due to the Cuban War of Independence, but it resumed immediately after the War of ended, when professional teams including the Almendares resumed play.  After the War, public attendance to baseball games increased, to over 5,000 weekly at Havana games. 

Professional baseball clubs were not always racially integrated in Cuba.  US racial barriers were first broken in Cuba in 1900, after which Cuban teams had access to the best Cuban players as well as those from the Negro league.  Almendares was able to stay competitive the longest without acquiring players from the United  States.  Integrated baseball in Cuba served as a transition to integrated baseball in the US.  In 1961 with Fulgencio Batista out of power and Fidel Castro taking over, professional baseball was abolished and replaced by the amateur Cuban baseball system.

Baseball was not only important as entertainment; it also was important to Cuban culture.  Among the most notable of the successes of Cuban baseball was  the elimination of racial discrimination in Cuban baseball and the provision of expanded opportunities to play and watch the game throughout the island.  Through good times and bad, baseball persisted as a source of national identity and collective unity.

References

Alexander, Charles C. Breaking the Slump. Columbia University Press: New York, 2002
Carter, Thomas F. The Quality of Home Runs: The Passion, Politics, and Language of Cuban Baseball. Durham: Duke University Press, 2008

Hatchwell, Emily., and Calder, Simon. Cuba: A Guide to the People, Politics and Culture. UK: Latin America Bureau, 1995
Kapacia, Antoni. Havana: The Making of Cuban Culture. Oxford: Berg, 2005
Perez Jr, Louis A. “Between Baseball and Bullfighting: The Quest for Nationality in Cuba, 1868-1898.” The Journal of American History,Vol.81, No. 2 (Sep., 1994), pp. 493-517
Perez Jr, Louis A.  On Becoming Cuban: Identity, Nationality, and Culture. University of North Carolina Press, 1999
Skinner, David. “Havana and Key West: Jose Mendez and the Scoreless Streak of 1908.” The National Pastime 24(Annual 2004):17

External links
Franchise history at Seamheads.com

Defunct baseball teams in Cuba
Cuban League teams